Asa Biggs (February 4, 1811 – March 6, 1878) was an American attorney, politician, and jurist who served as a member of both chambers of the United States Congress and as a United States district judge of the United States District Court for the Albemarle, Cape Fear and Pamptico Districts of North Carolina.

Education and career

Born on February 4, 1811, in Williamston, Martin County, North Carolina, Biggs attended the common schools and pursued classical studies, then read law in 1831. He was admitted to the bar and entered private practice in Williamston from 1831 to 1845, and from 1847 to 1854. In 1832, he married Martha Elizabeth Andrews; they had 10 children, 2 of which died in infancy.  Biggs owned "several slaves" as a result of his marriage.

He was a delegate to the North Carolina constitutional convention in 1835. He was a member of the North Carolina House of Commons (now the North Carolina House of Representatives) from 1840 to 1842. He was a member of the North Carolina Senate from 1844 to 1845.

Congressional service

Biggs was elected as a Democrat from North Carolina's 9th congressional district to the United States House of Representatives of the 29th United States Congress, serving from March 4, 1845, to March 3, 1847. He was an unsuccessful candidate for reelection in 1846. He was a member of a commission to codify North Carolina laws in 1851. He was elected as a Democrat to the United States Senate and served from March 4, 1855, until May 5, 1858, when he resigned to accept a federal judicial post.

Federal judicial service

Biggs was nominated by President James Buchanan on May 3, 1858, to a seat on the United States District Court for the Albemarle, Cape Fear and Pamptico Districts of North Carolina (also referenced officially as the United States District Court for the District of North Carolina) vacated by Judge Henry Potter. He was confirmed by the United States Senate on May 3, 1858, and received his commission the same day. His service terminated on April 23, 1861, due to his resignation.

Later career and death

Biggs was a member of the secession convention of North Carolina in 1861. Following his resignation from the federal bench, Biggs served as a Judge of the Confederate District Court for the District of North Carolina from 1861 to 1865. He resumed private practice in Tarboro, Edgecombe County, North Carolina, from 1865 to 1868. He continued private practice and was a businessman in Norfolk, Virginia, from 1868 to 1878. He died on March 6, 1878, in Norfolk. He was interred in Elmwood Cemetery in Norfolk.

Autobiography

During the American Civil War, Biggs took refuge at Dalkeith near the unincorporated community of Arcola, Warren County, North Carolina, where he wrote his autobiography.

Asa Biggs House

The Asa Biggs House and Site at Williamston was added to the National Register of Historic Places in 1979.

References

Sources

 Dictionary of American Biography; Biggs, Asa. Autobiography of Asa Biggs, Including a Journal of a Trip from North Carolina to New York in 1832. Edited by Robert D. W. Connor. North Carolina Historical Commission Publications. Bulletin No. 19. Raleigh: * Edwards and Broughton Printing Company, 1915. 
 

 Autobiography of Asa Biggs, Including a Journal of a Trip from North Carolina to New York in 1832. Raleigh, [N.C.]: Edwards & Broughton, 1915.

1811 births
1878 deaths
Democratic Party United States senators from North Carolina
Judges of the Confederate States of America
Judges of the United States District Court for the District of North Carolina
Democratic Party members of the North Carolina House of Representatives
Democratic Party North Carolina state senators
People from Williamston, North Carolina
United States federal judges appointed by James Buchanan
19th-century American judges
Democratic Party members of the United States House of Representatives from North Carolina
19th-century American politicians
United States federal judges admitted to the practice of law by reading law